The 1985 Polish Speedway season was the 1985 season of motorcycle speedway in Poland.

Individual

Polish Individual Speedway Championship
The 1985 Individual Speedway Polish Championship final was held on 15 September at Gorzów.

Golden Helmet
The 1985 Golden Golden Helmet organised by the Polish Motor Union (PZM) was the 1985 event for the league's leading riders. The final was held over three rounds.

Junior Championship
 winner - Zbigniew Błażejczak

Silver Helmet
 winner - Ryszard Franczyszyn

Bronze Helmet
 winner - Zbigniew Błażejczak

Pairs

Polish Pairs Speedway Championship
The 1985 Polish Pairs Speedway Championship was the 1985 edition of the Polish Pairs Speedway Championship. The final was held on 6 June at Rybnik.

Team

Team Speedway Polish Championship
The 1985 Team Speedway Polish Championship was the 1985 edition of the Team Polish Championship. 

Falubaz Zielona Góra won the gold medal. The team included Andrzej Huszcza, Maciej Jaworek and Jan Krzystyniak.

First League

Second League

References

Poland Individual
Poland Team
Speedway
1985 in Polish speedway